The 4th constituency of Doubs (French: Quatrième circonscription du Doubs) is one of five electoral districts in the department of the same name, each of which returns one deputy to the French National Assembly in elections using the two-round system, with a run-off if no candidate receives more than 50% of the vote in the first round.

Description
The constituency is made up of the six former cantons of Audincourt, Étupes, Hérimoncourt, Pont-de-Roide, Sochaux-Grand-Charmont, and Valentigney.

It includes Audincourt and Valentigney, both of which are southern suburbs of Montbéliard, and extends into the Jura mountains reaching as far as the border with Switzerland.

At the time of the 1999 census (which was the basis for the most recent redrawing of constituency boundaries, carried out in 2010) the 4th constituency had a total population of 96,933.

The seat swung between left and right for much of its history. In 2017, former PS deputy Frédéric Barbier gained the seat for Emmanuel Macron's centrist LREM party. Barbier lost the seat to Géraldine Grangier of the far-right RN party in 2022.

Historic representation

Election results

2022 

 
 
 
|-
| colspan="8" bgcolor="#E9E9E9"|
|-

2017

2012

Sources

Official results of French elections from 2002: "Résultats électoraux officiels en France" (in French).

4